Rutheopsis is a monotypic genus of flowering plants belonging to the family Apiaceae. It only contains one known species, Rutheopsis herbanica (Bolle) A.Hansen & G.Kunkel

It is native to the Canary Islands.

The genus name of Rutheopsis is in honour of Johann Friedrich Ruthe (1788–1859), a German teacher (Oberlehrer), botanist and entomologist. The genus has 2 known synonyms; Gliopsis  and Ruthea . The Latin specific epithet of herbanica refers to being herbaceous.
It was first described and published in Cuad. Bot. Canaria Vol.26-27 on page 61 in 1976.

It has been found that a dispersal from north-western Africa to the Canary Islands was retrieved for the common ancestor of Rutheopsis and Canaria , another monotypic Canary Island Apiaceae species. Both plants species are endemic to the Canary Islands and are glabrous perennials with yellow flowers and glabrous, ovoid to oblong fruits with thickened ribs. Rutheopsis herbanica is only found in Lanzarote and Fuerteventura. Where as Canaria tortuosa inhabits El Hierro, La Palma, La Gomera, Tenerife and Gran Canaria. They do differ somewhat in leaf division and the shape of the leaf lobes but generally they are morphologically similar. It has been suggested that Canaria tortuosa be renamed as Rutheopsis tortuosa .

References

Apiaceae
Apiaceae genera
Plants described in 1976
Flora of the Canary Islands